Logo signs (also known as specific service signs or Logo service signs, or colloquially as Big Blue Signs) are blue road signs used on freeways that display the logos or trademarks of businesses before travelers reach an exit or interchange. Typically, a business pays a small fee to a transportation department (or to a subcontractor of a transportation department such as Lamar Advertising subsidiary Interstate Logos) to have their logos displayed on a large panel alongside other businesses. Depending on the jurisdiction, businesses may have to meet certain criteria such as hours of service and distance from the sign.

History
Logo signs were permitted on rural Interstates beginning in 1965 as part of the Highway Beautification Act, though the signs did not come into general use, especially in the western states, until the mid 1970s.  Originally, such signs were limited to gas, food, lodging, etc..

In the United States 

The 1976 amendments to the Highway Beautification Act expanded the program to federal-aid primary rural highways.  In 2000, provisions for allowing logo signs on urban highways (as long as adequate sign spacing can be maintained) were added to the Manual on Uniform Traffic Control Devices; however, as of 2018 not all states have adopted these provisions, with some states (such as California and New York) continuing to restrict the installation of logo signs to rural highways only.  As of 2018, logo signs are permitted on urban highways in 18 states, with Tennessee being the most recent state (as of 2015) to repeal the restriction for installing logo signs on rural highways only. The 2000 MUTCD also added the attractions category, followed by the 2003 MUTCD which added the 24-hour pharmacies category. Logo signs in the United States are limited to six logos per sign, and additional signs may be used up to a total of four in each direction per interchange. In 2006, the Federal Highway Administration issued an interim approval to allow more than six logo panels per service type on up to two signs per direction, which was eventually incorporated into the 2009 Manual on Uniform Traffic Control Devices.

In E-470 on Colorado, the label "ATTRACTION" is replaced by "BUSINESS".
In California, as well as on the Pennsylvania Turnpike the label "GAS" is replaced by "FUEL".

In Puerto Rico 

SunColors contracted with Metropistas in 2019 to provide logo signs for Puerto Rico highways PR-5 and PR-22.

In Canada 

Logo signs are found along major highways in Ontario, namely 400-series highways 400 and 401. A separate signage is used for ONroute rest areas.

In the United Kingdom 

Logo signs (also known as Approach Signs) are found before many service stations on motorways in the United Kingdom. They were introduced in 2011 after operators of service stations were renaming subsidiaries to get around regulations which forbid brand names from appearing on road signs. The signs can contain up to 6 brand logos which operate at the service station, however the fuel operator must be listed first. Unlike other motorway road signs in the United Kingdom, these signs are the property of the service station operators, not National Highways.

References

Notes

External links

Traffic signs
Logos